Stockwith may refer to the following places in England:

East Stockwith, in Lincolnshire
West Stockwith, in Nottinghamshire